Zhan Sergeevich Kossobutskiy (born 13 November 1988) is a Kazakh professional boxer who has held the WBC International heavyweight title since May 2022.

Professional boxing career
Kossobutskiy made his professional debut against Edgars Kalnars on 23 September 2017, and won by a first-round technical knockout. He amassed an 11-0 record during the next two years, winning all but one of the fights by stoppage. 

Kossobutskiy faced Agron Smakici for the vacant IBO Inter-Continental heavyweight title on 11 November 2019. He won the fight by knockout, stopping the Croatian cruiserweight with just 20 seconds left in the first round. Kossobutskiy Abraham Tabul in a non-title bout on 6 March 2020. He won the fight by a second-round technical knockout. Kossobutskiy next faced Kamil Sokolowski on 4 August 2020, in his final fight of the year. He won the fight by knockout, stopping Sokolowski midway through the tenth and last round of the bout.

Kossobutskiy was expected to face Pavel Sour for the vacant WBA International heavyweight title on 20 February 2021, at the Universum Gym in Hamburg, Germany. Sour was forced to withdraw from the title fight after testing positive COVID-19 and was replaced by Onoriode Ehwarieme. Kossobutskiy knocked Ehwarieme down once in the third round, before finishing him in the fourth. After capturing the WBA secondary title, Kossobutskiy  signed a promotional deal with Frank Warren.

Kossobutskiy made his first title defense against Joey Dawejko on 21 August 2021, at the same venue and location in which he had won the secondary WBA belt. The bout was broadcast domestically in Germany by BILD+ and internationally as a FITE TV pay-per-view. Kossobutskiy won the fight by a second-round left hook knockout. Dawejko later claimed the finishing shot had landed to the back of his head, although the referee didn't seem to agree with him.

Kossobutskiy faced former WBC world title challenger Johann Duhaupas for the vacant WBC International heavyweight title on 21 May 2022. He won the fight by a fifth-round stoppage, as Duhaupas retired from the bout before the start of the sixth round.

Professional boxing record

References

External links

Kazakhstani male boxers
1988 births
Living people
Heavyweight boxers
People from Kostanay Region